Amanda Jacqueline Renner is an American sports journalist. She is a CBS Sports reporter for golf, college football, and the National Football League. She also served as a reporter for some of The Match golfing events.

Early life and education
Balionis was born in Pittsburgh, Pennsylvania and later moved to Lancaster, Pennsylvania. She played volleyball for Kutztown University of Pennsylvania for two years before transferring to Hofstra University, where she graduated in August 2008, majoring in broadcast journalism.

Career
She started her career covering high school sports for Verizon Fios Channel 1 and MSG Networks. In 2011, Balionis joined the PGA Tour as an in-house reporter and host, producing and reporting tournament highlights, shows, and events for the website. In 2016 she moved to Callaway Golf to work as an in-house reporter producing digital content for the golf manufacture's media production team. In 2017 CBS hired her as a part-time golf reporter and a year later promoted her to a full-time reporter and added college football and NFL games to her duties.

Personal life
In March 2022, she married former University of North Carolina and Baltimore Ravens quarterback and current FIU Quarterbacks coach Bryn Renner. She also runs a non-profit called Puppies and Golf, matching military veterans with dogs.

References

External links 
 

Living people
1985 births
People from Pittsburgh
Hofstra University alumni
20th-century American women
21st-century American women
Golf writers and broadcasters